Camille Botté (6 October 1888 – 9 December 1972) was a Belgian racing cyclist. He rode in the 1920 Tour de France.

References

1888 births
1972 deaths
Belgian male cyclists
Place of birth missing